Nortonville may refer to:

 Nortonville, California
 Nortonville, Kansas
 Nortonville, Kentucky

See also 

 Norton (disambiguation)